VU-3D is a 3D modelling software package for the ZX Spectrum home computer. It was published by Psion in 1982.

Using simple commands, the user may create a solid object or set of objects in three-dimensional space, observe, modify, print and store such displays.
VU-3D includes commands to allow the user, to move round the object and look at it from different distances and directions.
Object creation is done in Wire-frame model display, with the possibility of defining a light source and rendering a shaded view.

Software by Jonathon, Chris Jacob and Martin Stamp under the supervision of Charles Davies.

Along with VU-Calc and VU-File, it was part of Psion's productivity software suite.

References

 ZX Spectrum software
 1982 software
 Proprietary software
3D graphics software